Mohammed Said El Ammoury (born 29 June 1977) is a Moroccan cyclist.

Major results

2008
3rd National Road Race Championships
2009
1st Stage 5 Tour of Eritrea
3rd Overall Tour du Faso
2010
1st  National Road Race Championships
1st Stage 2 Tour du Mali
1st Challenge du Prince, Trophée de l'Anniversaire
3rd Les Challenges de la Marche Verte, GP Oued Ed-Dahab

References

1977 births
Living people
Moroccan male cyclists